Paul Onsongo (born 21 July 1948), is a Kenyan actor. He is most notable for the roles in the films Mountains of the Moon, Küken für Kairo and The Flame Trees of Thika.

Personal life
He was born on 21 July 1948 in Mombasa, Kenya.

Career
In 1974, he made film debut with the movie Wilby Conspiracy. In 1981, he made television debut with the mini series The Flame Trees of Thika. He played the supportive role of 'Juma' in the four episodes of the mini series. In the same year, he starred in the blockbuster biographical film Rise and Fall of Idi Amin where the film won five awards, including best actor, at the Las Vegas International Film Festival.

Then in 1985, he made appearance in the thriller film Küken für Kairo in which he played a minor role as 'Dealer'. In 1987, he made the lead role of Megitew in the television movie We Are the Children, where he became very popular. In 1989, he played the villain role of Abdullah in the film Cheetah. In 1990, he appeared in the biographical film Mountains of the Moon with the role 'Sidi Bombay'. His role became highly popular.

Filmography

References

External links
 

Living people
1948 births
People from Mombasa
21st-century Kenyan male actors
Kenyan male film actors
Kenyan male television actors